The Conservatoire national du Pélargonium is a municipal botanical garden specializing in pelargoniums, which is located within the municipal greenhouses (serres municipales) on the Chemin Tortiot, Bourges, Cher, Centre-Val de Loire, France. The collection was established in 1986 and now contains 250 pelargonium species and 1,100 cultivars. It describes itself as the largest such collection in France, and has been designated a member of the French Conservatoire des collections végétales spécialisées (CCVS).

See also 
 List of botanical gardens in France

References 
 Conservatoire national du Pélargonium
 BGCI entry
 Domaine de Courson entry (French)
 Culture.gouv.fr entry (French)
 Conservatoire des collections végétales spécialisées (French Wikipedia article)
 Techno-Science CCVS list (French)

Gardens in Cher (department)
Botanical gardens in France